Corniaspa was a town of ancient Pontus, near the frontiers of Galatia, inhabited during Roman and Byzantine times. Eunomius of Cyzicus may have been born at Corniaspa.

Its site is located east of Yozgat, Asiatic Turkey.

References

Populated places in ancient Pontus
Former populated places in Turkey
Roman towns and cities in Turkey
Populated places of the Byzantine Empire
History of Yozgat Province